The Shawmut Motor Company was organized in Stoneham, Massachusetts in 1905 to succeed the Phelps automobile. The Shawmut was manufactured from 1906 to 1908, when the factory was destroyed by fire. The company was headquartered in Boston.  A 1908 Shawmut Roundabout was the winner of the 1909 Ocean to Ocean Automobile Endurance Contest.

History 
The Shawmut Motor Company was organized in November, 1905 to succeed the Phelps Motor Vehicle Company.  Elliott C. Lee, past president of the American Automobile Association, was announced as president of Shawmut.   L. J. Phelps had designed a 4-cylinder engine before retiring to California in 1905.  For 1906, the first Shawmut was the Model 6, a luxury automobile with a four-cylinder 40-hp touring car body costing $4,750, .  The new Shawmut was introduced in March 1906 at the Boston Automobile Show, and December at the New York Show. 

From 1907, a less expensive Roundabout (short wheelbase touring car with no doors) model was produced for $3,500, .  For 1907 Shawmuts were designated Models A, B, C  and D, representing roadster, touring, limousine and landaulet body styles, priced from $4,750 to $6,500, .  All body styles were made with sheet aluminum by Boston's premier coachbuilder, Chauncy Thomas & Company.

In 1908 Shawmut engaged the Hol-Tan Company as their New York agency, with the intention to market cars as Hol-Tan Shawmut. 

On November 13, 1908 the Shawmut factory in Stoneham was destroyed by fire. Twenty cars of which 10 were finished were in the buildings. The loss of several buildings, manufacturing equipment and cars was judged to be $115,000. Shawmut was carrying $42,000 in Insurance.

In December 1908, the Shawmut Motor Company scouted Reading, Massachusetts for a factory site and in February 1909 scouted Fitchburg before finally settling on a new factory location in South Boston in April.  Shawmut could not raise the capital needed to re-start production and were closed by November 1909.

Motorsports 
In October 1907 two Shawmuts participated in the Bay State Endurance Run, driven by Arthur Ayers and Harold Church.  Church's Shawmut with a perfect score, was declared the winner with a Studebaker and Franklin when a tie run-off could not determine a single winner.

In May 1908, a Hol-Tan Shawmut participated in the First American International Road Race (Briarcliff Trophy Race) driven by William M. Hilliard.  It was running with other cars on the 8th lap when the race was called.

A Shawmut Roundabout was entered in the June 1909 Ocean to Ocean Automobile Endurance Contest from New York to Seattle.  It was driven by T. Arthur Pettengill, Robert Messer and Earle Chapin.  The Shawmut was the second to arrive in Seattle, behind the No. 2 Ford Model T.   Decades later, Earle Chapin described the 23 day race as a “fight for survival".  

The Shawmut team made a formal protest against the No. 2 Ford Model T stating it should be disqualified. This was disallowed and the Model T was declared the winner.  Four months later, it was recognized that the Ford Model T arrived in Seattle with a different engine from the start of the race.  In November 1909, the No. 2 Ford was disqualified and the Shawmut declared the winner.

Gallery

External links 

 1909 Transcontinental Automobile Race - America comes alive
 Car Industry in Stoneham Article - Explore Stoneham
 1909 Ocean to Ocean Race, did Ford win legally? - Model T Forum 
 Hidden history: The need for speed Magic Valley article
 Chauncey Thomas & Co at CoachBuilt

References

Defunct motor vehicle manufacturers of the United States
Motor vehicle manufacturers based in Massachusetts
Vehicle manufacturing companies established in 1905
Vehicle manufacturing companies disestablished in 1909
1905 establishments in Massachusetts
Luxury motor vehicle manufacturers
Luxury vehicles
Brass Era vehicles
1900s cars
Cars introduced in 1906